The Chickasaw Octagon House (also known as the Johnny Stocks Octagon House) is a historic octagonal house located on Court Street in Chickasaw, Iowa.

Description and history 
The construction of the house is attributed to Cyrus (Johnny)
Stocks. The first floor was completed in 1871 and the second floor was completed three years later. The house is built of limestone quarried locally, and set in a random ashlar pattern.  It is located in a rural area that was platted as the town of Chickasaw.

The house was added to the National Register of Historic Places on July 17, 1979.

References

Houses completed in 1871
Houses on the National Register of Historic Places in Iowa
Houses in Chickasaw County, Iowa
Octagon houses in Iowa
National Register of Historic Places in Chickasaw County, Iowa